Friedrich Adolf Paneth  (31 August 1887 – 17 September 1958) was an Austrian-born British chemist. Fleeing the Nazis, he escaped to Britain. He became a naturalized British citizen in 1939. After the war, Paneth returned to Germany to become director of the Max Planck Institute for Chemistry in 1953. He was considered the greatest authority of his time on volatile hydrides and also made important contributions to the study of the stratosphere.

Paneth's conception of ″chemical element″ functions as the official definition adopted by the IUPAC.

Biography 
Friedrich (Fritz) Paneth was born as son of the physiologist Joseph Paneth. He and his three brothers were brought up in Protestant faith although both parents were of Jewish descent. He was educated at the Schottengymnasium a renowned school in Vienna. He studied chemistry at the University of Vienna and after working with Adolf von Baeyer at the University of Munich he received his PhD with Zdenko Hans Skraup at the organic chemistry department of the University of Vienna in 1910.

He abandoned organic chemistry and in 1912 joined the Institute for Radium Research, Vienna radiochemistry group of Stefan Meyer. In 1913 he visited Frederick Soddy at the University of Glasgow and Ernest Rutherford at the University of Manchester. In this year he married Else Hartmann; they had a son and daughter. After his habilitation in 1913 he became assistant of Otto Hönigschmid at the University of Prague. From 1919 till 1933 he was professor in various German universities:(University of Hamburg 1919, Berlin University 1922, Königsberg University 1929. 
 
In 1927, Paneth and Kurt Peters published his results on the transformation of hydrogen to helium, now known as cold fusion. They later retracted the results, saying they had measured background helium from the air.

During Hitler's Machtergreifung in 1933 he was on a lecture tour in England and did not return to Germany. In 1939 he became professor at the University of Durham where he stayed until his retirement in 1953.

A call to become director at the Max Planck Institute for Chemistry in Mainz caused him to return to Germany. He founded the Department of Cosmochemistry there and initiated research on meteorites. He worked in the Institute until his death in 1958.

Career summary 
 Assistant in Institute for Radium Research attached to Austrian Academy of Sciences, Vienna, 1912
 Assistant professor, University of Hamburg, 1919
 Head of inorganic department of chemical institute, Berlin University, 1922
 Head of chemical institute, Königsberg University, 1929
 Reader in atomic chemistry, Imperial College London, 1938; among his assistants was Eugen Glueckauf
 Professor of chemistry, University of Durham, 1939
 Head of chemistry division of joint British-Canadian atomic energy team in Montreal, 1943-5
 Returned to Durham and established Londonderry Laboratory for radio-chemistry, heading it until retirement, 1953

Honours and awards 

Paneth received the Lieben Prize (1916), the Liversidge Award (1936), and the Liebig Medal (1957). He was elected a Fellow of the Royal Society in 1947.

The mineral panethite is named after him, as is the lunar crater Paneth.

See also 
 Fajans–Paneth–Hahn Law

External links
Biography

References

1887 births
1958 deaths
Burials at Döbling Cemetery
Fellows of the Royal Society
Jewish scientists
Academics of Durham University
Academics of Imperial College London
Scientists from Vienna
Austrian refugees
Jewish emigrants from Nazi Germany to the United Kingdom
Manhattan Project people
Academic staff of the University of Königsberg
Max Planck Institute directors